Kengeri Bus Terminal is a metro station in the Purple Line of the Namma Metro and is one of the most important metro stations since it holds the Kengeri Bus Terminus in the suburban city of Kengeri. It was inaugurated on 29 August 2021 and commenced to the public on 30 August 2021.

Station layout

Entry/Exit
There are 2 Entry/Exit points - A and B. Commuters can use either of the points for their travel.
Entry/Exit point A - Towards Kengeri side
Entry/Exit point B - Towards Kengeri side

See also 

 Bangalore
 List of Namma Metro stations
 Transport in Karnataka
 List of metro systems
 List of rapid transit systems in India
 Bangalore portal

References 



Namma Metro stations